The eastern grey gibbon or northern grey gibbon (Hylobates funereus) is a primate in the gibbon family, Hylobatidae.

Taxonomy 
Formerly, the eastern grey gibbon and western grey gibbon (H. abbotti) were considered conspecific with the southern grey gibbon (H. muelleri), but more recent studies indicate that all three are distinct species, and both the IUCN Red List and the American Society of Mammalogists consider them such. However, they can still hybridize with one another where their ranges meet.

Distribution 
It is endemic to northeastern Borneo, and is found in Kalimantan, Sarawak, and Brunei. It ranges from Sabah south to the Mahakam River in East Kalimantan, and west to Baram in Sarawak.

Conservation 
As with the other two grey gibbons, this species is thought to be endangered due to heavy deforestation in Borneo, as well as increases in forest fires exacerbated by El Niño events. It is also threatened by illegal hunting and capture for the pet trade.

References 

Eastern gray gibbon
Primates of Indonesia
Endemic fauna of Borneo
Mammals of Borneo
Mammals of Indonesia
Mammals of Brunei
Mammals of Malaysia
Endangered fauna of Asia
Species endangered by the pet trade
Eastern gray gibbon
Taxa named by Isidore Geoffroy Saint-Hilaire